In enzymology, a phthalate 4,5-cis-dihydrodiol dehydrogenase is an enzyme that catalyzes the chemical reaction

cis-4,5-dihydroxycyclohexa-1(6),2-diene-1,2-dicarboxylate + NAD+  4,5-dihydroxyphthalate + NADH + H+

Thus, the two substrates of this enzyme are cis-4,5-dihydroxycyclohexa-1(6),2-diene-1,2-dicarboxylate and NAD+, whereas its 3 products are 4,5-dihydroxyphthalate, NADH, and H+.

This enzyme belongs to the family of oxidoreductases, specifically those acting on the CH-CH group of donor with NAD+ or NADP+ as acceptor.  The systematic name of this enzyme class is cis-4,5-dihydroxycyclohexa-1(6),2-diene-1,2-dicarboxylate:NAD+ oxidoreductase. This enzyme participates in 2,4-dichlorobenzoate degradation.

References

 

EC 1.3.1
NADH-dependent enzymes
Enzymes of unknown structure